Sylvester & Orphanos was a publishing house originally founded in Los Angeles by Ralph Sylvester, Stathis Orphanos and George Fisher in 1972. When Fisher moved to New York City, Sylvester & Orphanos specialized in limited-signed press books.

Origins
Christopher Isherwood was the first author published by Sylvester & Orphanos with a deluxe edition of Christopher and His Kind illustrated by original artwork from Isherwood's partner, Don Bachardy.

Through Isherwood, Sylvester & Orphanos met Gore Vidal and they published Vidal’s Sex Is Politics and Vice Versa.

Founders
Stathis Orphanos (October 12, 1940 – January 13, 2018) and Ralph Sylvester (January 13, 1934 – January 23, 2018) were partners in life and business. They met in Los Angeles in 1960.

Stathis Orphanos was also a photographer and among his works are portraits of:

Don Bachardy
Kaye Ballard
Clive Barker
Donald Barthelme
John Barth
Leonard Baskin
Robert Bloch
Claire Bloom
Steve Bond
John Malcolm Brinnin
Shirley Burden
Paul Cadmus
Erskine Caldwell
Jim Carroll
Maxwell Caulfield
John Cheever
Robert Coover
Malcolm Cowley
Mart Crowley
George Cukor
Jules Dassin
Elaine de Kooning
James Dickey
P. David Ebersole
Harlan Ellison
Odysseus Elytis
James Galanos
Graham Greene
Thom Gunn
Julie Harris
David Hockney
Horst P. Horst
Todd Hughes
John Irving
Christopher Isherwood
Thomas Keneally
Gavin Lambert
Jack Larson and James Bridges
Jerome Lawrence and Robert E. Lee
Naguib Mahfouz
Michael Mailer
Norman Mailer
James Merrill
Brian Moore
Esai Morales
Hermes Pan
Reynolds Price
José Quintero
Rex Reed
Edouard Roditi
Philip Roth
May Sarton
John Schlesinger
Budd Schulberg
Hubert Selby, Jr.
Sir Stephen Spender
Robert Stone
William Styron
Edmund Teske
John Updike
Mamie Van Doren
Gore Vidal
John A. Williams
Colin Wilson

In 2015, Sylvester & Orphanos donated their catalogue and photographs to the Library of Congress.

Exhibitions

 Photography exhibition, San Diego County, 1988
 Los Angeles, 1989, curated by Shirley Burden, former Chairman of the Department of Photography at New York's Museum of Modern Art
 University of California, Los Angeles, 1990, Combined exhibition of Stahis Orphanos photographs and limited-edition books, curated by Dan Luckenbill
 Beverly Hills Public Library 1995, curated by Stefan Klima
 Beverly Hills Civic Center, 1996, retrospective of Stathis Orphanos' photographs
 Honor: Marine Portraits, Oceanside Museum of Art, 2010
 My Cavafy, Photo Exhibit by Stathis Orphanos, Affinity, West Hollywood
 2014, The Perfect Exposure Gallery, Los Angeles

Catalogue
Sylvester & Orphanos published in total 25 limited editions:

 1976, Christopher Isherwood, Christopher and His Kind, 130 copies
 1978, Joyce Carol Oates, Sentimental Education
 1979, Gore Vidal, Sex is Politics and Vice Versa 
 1979, William Styron, Shadrach
 1980, Graham Greene, How Father Quixote Became a Monsignor
 1980, John Cheever, The Leaves, the Lion-Fish, and the Bear
 1980, Nadine Gordimer, Town and Country Lovers
 1980, V. S. Naipaul, A Congo Diary
 1980, Margaret Drabble, Hassan's Tower
 1980, James Merrill, Samos
 1980, Donald Barthelme, The Emerald
 1980, J. V. Cunningham, Dickinson: Lyric and Legend
 1980, Reynolds Price, A Final Letter
 1980, Philip Roth, Novotny's Pain
 1981, James Purdy, Scrap of Paper & The Beiry-Picker: Two Plays by James Purdy
 1981, Tennessee Williams, It Happened the Day the Sun Rose
 1981, Paul Bowles, In the Red Room
 1982, Richard Adams, The Legend of Te Tuna 
 1982, John Cheever, The National Pastime
 1983, Graham Greene, A Quick Look Behind: Footnotes to an Autobiography
 1985, William Hjortsberg, Tales & Fables
 1985, John Updike, Impressions
 1988, John Cheever, Expelled
 1990, Graham Greene, A Weed Among the Flowers
 1990, Yannis Tsarouchis: The Face of Modem Greece (in preparation in 1990, likely not released)

References

Book publishing companies based in California
American companies established in 1972
Publishing companies established in 1972
Gay men